Siege of Theodosia can refer to:
 Siege of Theodosia (389 BC)
 Siege of Theodosia (c. 365 BC)
 Siege of Theodosia (c. 360 BC)